The Córdova Rebellion, in 1838, was an uprising instigated in and around Nacogdoches, Texas. Alcalde Vicente Córdova and other leaders supported the Texas Revolution as long as it espoused a return to the Constitution of 1824,

It erupted in Texas in 1839 and was rooted in the tensions between Tejanos, who had lived in Texas for generations, and Anglo Americans, who were taking control of the land and political institutions. The government responded with military expeditions, the trial and execution of several leaders, and the imprisonment and exile of many others. The rebellion deepened existing tensions and mistrust between Tejanos and Anglo Americans and marked a turning point in the history of Tejano resistance to Anglo American domination in Texas.

Background
Beginning as early as late 1835, Córdova had covertly started to plan and organize local resistance, anticipating Texas would declare independence from Mexico. In the late summer of 1838, word arrived from several sources that Mexico was seeking an arrangement with the Cherokee which would give them title to their land in exchange for assistance in joining a war of extermination against the Texans.

Battleground Prairie

Nacogdochians looking for a stolen horse found a camp of around one hundred armed Tejanos. Rather than allow the local militia to act, President Sam Houston (who was in Nacogdoches at the time) prohibited both sides from assembly or carrying weapons. Local alcalde Vicente Córdova and eighteen other leaders of the revolt issued a proclamation with a number of demands to be met, before the surrender of their arms. After being joined by about three hundred Indian warriors, they moved toward the Cherokee settlements.

Despite Houston's orders that he should not cross the Angelina River to interfere, Thomas J. Rusk, who was at this time Nacogdoches County's Representative in the Texas Congress, sent a party of 150 men under Major Henry Augustine on to confront them.

On March 29, 1839, a company of 80 men commanded by General Edward Burleson defeated Vicente Córdova and the rebels during a fight near Seguin, Texas, at "Battleground Prairie."  While wounded and pursued by Mathew Caldwell and his rangers, Córdova was able to make his way to Mexico, but 33 members of the rebellion were tried for treason and later pardoned or released.

Related events

A few weeks later, a Mexican agent was killed near the Red River.  A diary and papers were found on his body which indicated that the Government of Mexico was working to incite the Cherokee and other tribes to rebel against Texas in exchange for recognition of tribal lands.  Additional documents were found after a battle on the North San Gabriel River on May 17 and on May 18, 1839, after a party of Texas Rangers defeated a group of Mexicans and Cherokee.  These documents included letters from Mexican officials addressed to Córdova and The Bowl, a Cherokee chief.

Despite the involvement of some Cherokee and the discovery of documents  intended for Chief Bowl, Houston believed the chief's denials and refused to order them arrested. In his several letters of reassurance to The Bowl during the unrest, Houston again promised them title to their land on the Neches River. Warriors believing their lands to be violated by the legal settlers then perpetrated the October 1838 what was called the Killough massacre, killing eighteen people.

Texas' second president, Mirabeau B. Lamar, had served under Georgia's Governor George M. Troup during the expropriation of Creek Indian lands for the benefit of white settlers in that state. Never sympathetic toward Indians in general and predisposed to the removal of the Cherokee, in the wake of the Killough incident and the publication of Rachel Plummer's narrative of her captivity among the Comanche, Lamar's demands that the Cherokee leave Texas resulted in the Cherokee War in 1839 and the violent expulsion – commonly referred to as "removal" – of the Cherokee to Indian Territory.

Cordova returned to Texas with General Adrián Woll's 1842 invasion and occupation of San Antonio. He was killed in the subsequent Battle of Salado Creek, September 18, 1842.

See also

 Texas-Indian Wars
 Timeline of the Republic of Texas
 Cherokee history
 Mount Tabor Indian Community

References

Citations

Conflicts in 1838
Republic of Texas
History of the Cherokee in Texas
Texas–Indian Wars
Wars involving the indigenous peoples of North America